The 1931 Campeonato Paulista, organized by the APEA (Associação Paulista de Esportes Atléticos), was the 30th season of São Paulo's top association football league. São Paulo won the title for the 1st time. no teams were relegated and the top scorer was Santos's Feitiço with 39 goals.

System
The championship was disputed in a double-round robin system, with the team with the most points winning the title.

Championship

Top Scorers

References

Campeonato Paulista seasons
Paulista